Iliana B. Baums is a professor at Pennsylvania State University known for her work on coral reef ecology.

Education and career 
Baums' education began at the University of Tuebingen and the University of Bremen. She earned a Ph.D. from the University of Miami in 2004, where her dissertation received the F.G. Walton prize for best dissertation. In 2017 and 2018 Baums was a fellow at the Alexander von Humboldt Foundation in Germany. Baums joined the Pennsylvania State University in 2006 and, as of 2022, is a professor in the department of biology.

Research 
Baums' early research examined the genetic diversity in Elkhorn coral and the use of genetic tools to aid restoration efforts in coral reefs. She has used genetic tools to track the distribution of Porites lobata, Porites astreoides, and the connections between corals and the organisms that live within the coral tissue. Following the Deepwater Horizon oil spill, Baums investigated the impact of the dispersant on deep-sea corals in the Gulf of Mexico. Baums' research has revealed that when corals mutate, they are able to pass on beneficial mutations to the next generation and she has dated elkhorn corals found in the Caribbean to more than 5000 years old.

Selected publications

References

External links 

Living people
University of Miami alumni
Pennsylvania State University faculty
American ecologists
Women ecologists
Women marine biologists
University of Tübingen alumni
University of Bremen alumni
Year of birth missing (living people)